DDO may refer to:

Science and technology 
 David Dunlap Observatory Catalogue, a catalogue of dwarf galaxies that was published in 1959
 DDO (gene), that encodes the D-aspartate oxidase enzyme
 Distant detached objects, class of minor planets in the outer reaches of the Solar System
 Dynamic Drive Overlay, a software technique to extend a system BIOS

Games
 Dungeons & Dragons Online, a massively multiplayer online role-playing game

Titles
 Deputy Director for Operations, particularly as the title of a specific CIA official; cf. article
 The above title is sometimes incorrectly rendered as Deputy Director of Operations; especially this latter term is also in generic use as the title of officials in business or other organizations.
 Director of Operations, particularly in francophone environments, from the French Directeur Des Opérations.
 Diocesan Director of Ordinands, a priest in a Church of England diocese overseeing the ordination process

Other
 DDO Artists Agency, a talent agency
 Dollard-des-Ormeaux, on-island suburb of Montreal in southwestern Quebec, Canada
 Tsez language, by ISO 639-3 code
 Den Danske Ordbog, a dictionary of Danish

See also